Ellis Lloyd may refer to:

Ellis Lloyd (of Rhiwgogh), Welsh landowner and MP for Merioneth
Charles Ellis Lloyd (1879–1939), known as Ellis Lloyd, novelist, barrister and politician